Ayothaya (from Sanskrit अयोध्य ayōdhya, "unconquerable") may refer to several places:

 Ayodhya, city in India
 Ayothaya (city), ancient city in present-day Thailand, being a vassal state of Lavo Kingdom and the predecessor of Ayutthaya Kingdom
 Ayutthaya Kingdom, called Ayothaya until it was conquered by King Bayinnaung of Burma
 Ayothaya (town), town in Phra Nakhon Si Ayutthaya Province, Thailand

See also
 Ayutthaya (disambiguation)